Mariandl's Homecoming (German: Mariandls Heimkehr) is a 1962 Austrian musical drama film directed by Werner Jacobs and starring Cornelia Froboess, Rudolf Prack and Waltraut Haas. It is a sequel to the 1961 film Mariandl.

It was shot at the Sievering Studios in Vienna.
The film's sets were designed by the art directors Fritz Jüptner-Jonstorff and Alexander Sawczynski.

Cast
 Cornelia Froboess as Mariandl 
 Rudolf Prack as Hofrat Franz Geiger 
 Waltraut Haas as Marianne Mühlhuber 
 Gunther Philipp as Gustl Pfüller 
 Peter Weck as Peter Hofer 
 Susi Nicoletti as Franzi 
 Sieghardt Rupp as Deininger 
 Horst Naumann as Burghaus 
 Andrea Klass as Liesl - Franzis Freundin
 Dany Sigel as Muschi 
 Eva Iro as Erika 
 Hugo Gottschlich as Ferdl, Dienstmann 
 Peter Machac as Fritz 
 Hans Moser as Opa Windischgruber

References

External links
 

1962 films
1960s musical drama films
1960s German-language films
Films directed by Werner Jacobs
Austrian musical drama films
Films scored by Hans Lang
Austrian sequel films
1962 drama films
Films shot at Sievering Studios